Daniele Cesaretti (born 19 April 1954) is a Sammarinese former cyclist. He competed at the 1972 Summer Olympics and the 1976 Summer Olympics.

References

External links
 

1954 births
Living people
Sammarinese male cyclists
Olympic cyclists of San Marino
Cyclists at the 1972 Summer Olympics
Cyclists at the 1976 Summer Olympics